There have been numerous professional baseball teams in Connecticut since the late 1800's. Most have been minor league teams, however, some early major league teams played in Connecticut. The last major league team was the Hartford Dark Blues, which played its final season in Hartford as a charter member of the newly-established modern National League in 1876.

History

New Britain/Bristol
Minor League Baseball in New Britain has had a wide variety of teams and notable players, famous players  such as Roger Clemens, David Ortiz and Curt Schilling have played for New Britain; The individual considered the fastest pitcher in professional baseball, Steve Dalkowski, also grew up in New Britain.  The Boston Red Sox former AA Pawtucket Red Sox moved to Bristol in 1973, and then to New Britain in 1983.  In 1995 the New Britain Red Sox became the Minnesota Twins affiliate and changed their name to the Rock Cats.  The team switched its affiliation to the Colorado Rockies prior to the 2015 season and left New Britain in favor of Hartford at the end of the 2015 season, but was replaced by the Independent New Britain Bees of the Atlantic League.

At the end of the 2019 season, the New Britain Bees announced the franchise was leaving the Atlantic League, and reorganizing as an amateur team in the New England-based Futures Collegiate Baseball League (FCBL). The nearby Bristol Blues transferred from the FCBL to the New England Collegiate Baseball League (NECBL) at the end of 2019, creating a vacancy in the league for the Bees.

Hartford
Hartford had nearly continuous baseball from 1874 to 1952, including early major league baseball teams from 1874–1877.  Notable events include five league titles by the Hartford Senators. In 2016, the former minor league club from New Britain began play as the Hartford Yard Goats, but did not play a home game in Hartford until 2017.

Waterbury
Several different Minor League Baseball teams have been located in the city of Waterbury, Connecticut since 1884.  These include 1884–1888, 1891, 1894–1895, 1897–1902, 1906–1914, 1918–1928, 1947–1950, 1966–1971, 1973–1986. Teams won their respective league championships three times in 1924, 1925, and 1970.

The earliest Waterbury teams played in the Connecticut State League between 1884 and 1912. These teams went by several different nicknames during this period, including the Brassmen, Brass City, Indians, Pirates, Rough Riders, Authors, Invisibles, Finnegans, Champs and Spuds. The Waterbury Brasscos (also called the Nattatucks) played in the old Eastern League from 1918–1928. They won two league titles in 1924 and 1925. The Waterbury Timers played in the Colonial League between 1947 and 1950.

Waterbury became home to professional baseball again in 1966 when the Waterbury Giants, an affiliate of Major League Baseball's San Francisco Giants came to town. From 1966–1986 (with the exception of 1972), the Waterbury team played in the Eastern League as an affiliate of the Giants, Cleveland Indians, Los Angeles Dodgers, Oakland Athletics, Cincinnati Reds and California Angels. The team name changed every time the affiliation agreement changed hands. Waterbury did not have an Eastern League team at the start of the 1972 season. However, in the middle of the season, flooding made the ballpark in Elmira, New York unusable, and so the Elmira Pioneers played their "home games" in the second half of the 1972 season in Waterbury.

The Independent Northeast League chose to place a team in Waterbury in 1997 as the Waterbury Spirit, but they moved after the 2000 season to become the North Shore Spirit.

Summary of franchises by city

Bridgeport

Former Bridgeport teams

Hartford

Hartford Yard Goats (active)

Former Hartford teams

New Britain/Bristol

Active former professional teams

Former New Britain teams

Former Bristol teams

Middletown

Former Middletown teams

Norwich

Norwich Sea Unicorns (active)

Former Norwich teams

New Haven

Former New Haven and metro area teams

Waterbury

Former Waterbury teams

References

Baseball Reference

External links
Baseball Reference
Baseball Waterbury heritage

Baseball in Connecticut

baseball